Matthew Christopher Gonzalez (born July 29, 1991) is an American mixed martial artist and former Greco–Roman wrestler who currently competes in the lightweight division of Bellator MMA. As a wrestler, Gonzalez won the 2016 senior Greco-Roman World Team Trials and went on to represent the United States at the 2016 World Championships at 71 kilograms and placed second at the 2017 US Open.

Background 
Gonzalez was born and raised in Chicago, Illinois, where he attended Bloom Trail High School. As a high schooler, he was a multi–sport athlete, competing in wrestling, basketball, football and track and field. Despite never qualifying for the state championships as he was sidetracked by injuries as a junior and senior and being a late starter in the sport, Gonzalez decided to pursue college wrestling. After bouncing from Northern Illinois University to Harper College, Gonzalez became an NJCAA All–American in 2012. Gonzalez then accepted a scholarship to wrestle at the Northern Michigan University, which offered a Greco-Roman program. Throughout his international career, Gonzalez, who represented the New York Athletic Club, went on to make the 2016 US World Team, placing 8th at the World Championships, placed multiple times at the US Open and claimed medals from tournaments such as the Dave Schultz and Bill Farrell Memorial Internationals.

Mixed martial arts career

Early career 
After his performance at the 2016 US Olympic Team Trials, Gonzalez considered transitioning over to mixed martial arts, however, it was not until 2018 when he made his professional debut in the sport, winning by submission at the Gladiator Challenge.

Bellator MMA 
In December 2018, it was announced that Gonzalez had signed with Bellator MMA. In January 2019 it was announced that he was scheduled to make his promotional debut against Henry Mendez at Bellator 214 on January 26, 2019. After Mendez withdrew from the bout, Gonzalez eventually made his promotional debut at Bellator 221 in May 11, 2019, defeating Charles Radtke by unanimous decision.

Gonzalez had his third professional fight at Bellator 226 when he faced Luis Vargas in September 7, 2019. He dominated the bout, heavily utilizing his wrestling to claim the win by unanimous decision.

To start off 2020, Gonzalez competed at Bellator 239 in February 21, defeating Aaron McKenzie by split decision. He then continued his win streak when he defeated Vladimir Tokov by the same method in August 21 at Bellator 244.

His first finish in the promotion came when he knocked out former UFC veteran Roger Huerta in April 2, 2021, at Bellator 255.

Gonzalez faced Goiti Yamauchi on July 31, 2021 at Bellator 263. He lost the bout via TKO in the first round.

Gonzalez faced Saad Awad on January 29, 2022 at Bellator 273. He won the bout via knockout 36 seconds into the first round.

Gonzalez faced Usman Nurmagomedov on July 22, 2022 at Bellator 283. He lost the bout via guillotine choke in the first round.

Gonzalez wasa scheduled to face Shamil Nikaev on December 9, 2022 at Bellator 289. However, the bout was scrapped due to unknown reasons.

Gonzalez faced Max Rohskopf on February 4, 2023, at Bellator 290. He won the bout via TKO in the second round.

Gonzalez is scheduled to face Tim Wilde on May 12, 2023, at Bellator 296.

Personal life 
Christopher's father, Gaspar Gonzalez, was born and raised in Havana, Cuba and immigrated to the United States in 1961.

Mixed martial arts record

|-
|Win
|align=center|8–2
|Max Rohskopf
|TKO (punches)
|Bellator 290
|
|align=center|2
|align=center|1:22
|Inglewood, California, United States
|
|-
|Loss
|align=center|7–2
|Usman Nurmagomedov
|Submission (guillotine choke)
|Bellator 283
|
|align=center|1
|align=center|2:54
|Tacoma, Washington, United States
|
|-
|Win
|align=center|7–1
|Saad Awad
|KO (head kick and punches)
|Bellator 273
|
|align=center|1
|align=center|0:36
|Phoenix, Arizona, United States
|
|-
|Loss
|align=center|6–1
|Goiti Yamauchi
|TKO (punches)
|Bellator 263
|
|align=center|1
|align=center|3:53
|Los Angeles, California, United States
|
|-
|Win
|align=center|6–0
|Roger Huerta
|TKO (submission to punches)
|Bellator 255 
|
|align=center|2
|align=center|3:01
|Uncasville, Connecticut, United States
|
|-
|Win
|align=center|5–0
|Vladimir Tokov
|Decision (split)
|Bellator 244
|
|align=center|3
|align=center|2:09
|Uncasville, Connecticut, United States
|
|-
|Win
|align=center|4–0
|Aaron McKenzie
|Decision (split)
|Bellator 239
|
|align=center|3
|align=center|5:00
|Thackerville, Oklahoma, United States
|
|-
|Win
|align=center|3–0
|Luis Vargas
|Decision (unanimous)
|Bellator 226
|
|align=center|3
|align=center|5:00
|San Jose, California, United States
|
|-
|Win
|align=center|2–0
|Charlie Radtke
|Decision (unanimous)
|Bellator 221
|
|align=center|3
|align=center|5:00
|Rosemont, Illinois, United States
|
|-
|Win
|align=center|1–0
|Tyrese McCloud
|Submission 
|Gladiator Challenge
|
|align=center|1
|align=center|1:30
|Lincoln, California, United States
|

See also 
 List of current Bellator fighters
 List of male mixed martial artists

References

External links 
 
 

1991 births
Living people
American male sport wrestlers
Amateur wrestlers
American male mixed martial artists
Lightweight mixed martial artists
Mixed martial artists utilizing collegiate wrestling
Mixed martial artists utilizing Greco-Roman wrestling
Bellator male fighters